"Les enfants du Pirée" ("Children of Piraeus") is a French song by singer Dalida, first released on EP in June 1960. It was a big international summer hit and remained one of major successes of her career. The song comes from the Greek movie "Never on Sunday/Pote tin Kyriaki" nominated for 8 Oscars and won an Oscar for the music of Manos Hadjidakis, sung by Melina Mercouri who starred in the movie along Jules Dassin.

It is also the title song of her eponymous album, the first one to be released in the 1960s.

Charts

References

Bibliography 

External links 

 Dalida Official Website "Discography" section

Dalida songs
1959 songs
Songs about Greece